Ina Strøjer-Schmidt (born 20 September 1988) is a Danish politician, who is a member of the Folketing for the Socialist People's Party. She was elected into parliament at the 2019 Danish general election.

Political career
Strøjer-Schmidt was elected into parliament at the 2019 election, although initially at low odds. Before the election she was a relatively unknown politician, and with prominent candidate Serdal Benli also running in the Greater Copenhagen constituency for the Socialist People's Party, experts did not expect to see Strøjer-Schmidt elected. In the election Strøjer-Schmidt received around 4,000 votes while Benli only received around 3,000. Strøjer-Schmidt remained relatively unknown after the election as well, however, with several political commentators not recognizing her name. In the beginning of the 2019—2023 term she was absent in many votes in the parliament, due to her being a member of Nordic Council.

References

External links 
 Biography on the website of the Danish Parliament (Folketinget)

1988 births
Living people
Socialist People's Party (Denmark) politicians
21st-century Danish women politicians
Women members of the Folketing
Members of the Folketing 2019–2022